Grete Hermann (2 March 1901 – 15 April 1984) was a German mathematician and philosopher noted for her work in mathematics, physics, philosophy and education. She is noted for her early philosophical work on the foundations of quantum mechanics, and is now known most of all for an early, but long-ignored critique of a "no hidden-variables theorem" by John von Neumann. It has been suggested that, had her critique not remained nearly unknown for decades, the historical development of quantum mechanics might have been very different.

Mathematics 
Hermann studied mathematics at Göttingen under Emmy Noether and Edmund Landau, where she achieved her PhD in 1926.  Her doctoral thesis, "Die Frage der endlich vielen Schritte in der Theorie der Polynomideale" (in English "The Question of Finitely Many Steps in Polynomial Ideal Theory"), published in Mathematische Annalen, is the foundational paper for computer algebra.  It first established the existence of algorithms (including complexity bounds) for many of the basic problems of abstract algebra, such as ideal membership for polynomial rings.  Hermann's algorithm for primary decomposition is still in contemporary use.

Assistant to Leonard Nelson 
From 1925 to 1927, Hermann worked as assistant for Leonard Nelson. Together with Minna Specht, she posthumously published Nelson's work System der philosophischen Ethik und Pädagogik, while continuing her own research.

Quantum mechanics 
As a philosopher, Hermann had a particular interest in the foundations of physics.  In 1934, she went to Leipzig "for the express purpose of reconciling a neo-Kantian conception of causality with the new quantum mechanics". In Leipzig, many exchanges of thoughts took place among Hermann, Carl Friedrich von Weizsäcker, and Werner Heisenberg.  The contents of her work in this time, including a focus on a distinction of predictability and causality, are known from three of her own publications, and from later description of their discussions by von Weizsäcker, and the discussion of Hermann's work in chapter ten of Heisenberg's The Part and The Whole.  From Denmark, she published her work The foundations of quantum mechanics in the philosophy of nature (German original title: Die naturphilosophischen Grundlagen der Quantenmechanik).  This work has been referred to as "one of the earliest and best philosophical treatments of the new quantum mechanics". In this work, she concludes:

In June 1936, Hermann was awarded the Richard Avenarius prize together with Eduard May and Th. Vogel.

Earlier, in 1935, Hermann published a critique of John von Neumann's 1932 proof which was widely claimed to show that a hidden variable theory of quantum mechanics was impossible.  Hermann's work on this subject went unnoticed by the physics community until it was independently discovered and published by John Stewart Bell in 1966, and her earlier discovery was pointed out by Max Jammer in 1974.  Some have posited that had her critique not remained nearly unknown for decades, her ideas would have put in question the unequivocal acceptance of the Copenhagen interpretation of quantum mechanics, by providing a credible basis for the further development of nonlocal hidden variable theories, which would have changed the historical development of quantum mechanics.

Political activism 
As Adolf Hitler came to power in Germany, Hermann participated in the underground movement against the Nazis. She was a member of the Internationaler Sozialistischer Kampfbund (ISK).

Emigration and later years 
By 1936, Hermann left Germany for Denmark and later France and England.   In London, in order to avoid standing out on account of her German provenance, she married a man called Edward Henry early in 1938.   Her prescience was justified by events:  two years later the British government invoked its hitherto obscure Regulation 18B of the Defence (General) Regulations 1939, identifying several thousand refugees who had fled Germany for reasons of politics or race as enemy aliens and placing them in internment camps.

After the war ended in 1945 she was able to combine her interests in physics and mathematics with political philosophy. She rejoined the Social Democratic Party (SPD) on returning in 1946 to what would become, in 1949, the German Federal Republic (West Germany). Starting in 1947 she was one of those contributing behind the scenes to the Bad Godesberg Programme, prepared under the leadership of her longstanding ISK comrade Willi Eichler, and issued in 1959, which provided a detailed modernising platform that carried the party into government in the 1960s.

She was nominated professor for philosophy and physics at the Pädagogische Hochschule in Bremen and played a relevant role in the Gewerkschaft Erziehung und Wissenschaft. From 1961 to 1978, she presided over the Philosophisch-Politische Akademie, an organisation founded by Nelson in 1922, oriented towards education, social justice, responsible political action and its philosophical basis.

Works 
Articles
 Grete Hermann: Die naturphilosophischen Grundlagen der Quantenmechanik, Naturwissenschaften, Volume 23, Number 42, 718–721,  (preview in German language)
 Grete Hermann: Die Frage der endlich vielen Schritte in der Theorie der Polynomideale. Unter Benutzung nachgelassener Sätze von K. Hentzelt, Mathematische Annalen, Volume 95, Number 1, 736–788,  (abstract in German language) — The question of finitely many steps in polynomial ideal theory (review and English-language translation)

References

Further reading
 C. Herzenberg: Grete Hermann: Mathematician, Physicist, Philosopher, Bulletin of the American Physical Society, 2008 APS April Meeting and HEDP/HEDLA Meeting, Volume 53, Number 5, 11–15 April 2008 in St. Louis, Missouri (abstract)
 Vera Venz: Zur Biografie von Grete Hermann, GRIN 2009, First edition 2001,  (in German language)

External links 
 
 Grete Henry's "The Significance of Behaviour Study for the Critique of Reason," Ratio, Volume XV, No. 2, December 1973 at the Friesian School
 Grete Henry-Hermann: Politically minded scientist by F. Kersting (German language version, exhibition catalog )
 Grete Hermann: Mathematician, Philosopher and Physicist by Giulia Paparo (MA Thesis) at Academia.edu [accessible with free registration]

1901 births
1984 deaths
20th-century German mathematicians
20th-century German philosophers
20th-century German physicists
20th-century German women scientists
German women physicists
Philosophers of science
German women mathematicians
German women philosophers
20th-century women mathematicians